Family Business Review is a peer-reviewed academic journal that publishes papers in the field of Business. The journal's editor is G. Tyge Payne (Texas Tech University). It has been in publication since 1988 and is currently published by SAGE Publications in association with the Family Firm Institute.

Scope 
Family Business Review seeks to explore the dynamics of family-controlled enterprise, including firms ranging in size from the very large to the relatively small. The scholarly journal publishes interdisciplinary research on families of wealth and the family office covering such areas as succession planning, the impact of family dynamics on managerial behaviors and estate and tax planning.

Abstracting and indexing 
Family Business Review is abstracted and indexed in, among other databases:  SCOPUS, and the Social Sciences Citation Index. According to the Journal Citation Reports, its 2018 impact factor is 6.188, ranking it #13 out of 147 journals in the category ‘Business’.

References

External links 
 
 

English-language journals
Publications established in 1988
SAGE Publishing academic journals